The 2008–09 GMHL season was the third season of the Greater Metro Junior A Hockey League (GMHL). The fifteen teams of the GMHL played 43-game schedules.

In February 2009, the top teams of the league played down for the Russell Cup, emblematic of the grand championship of the GMHL.  Since the GMHL is independent from Hockey Canada and the Canadian Junior Hockey League, this is where the GMHL's season ended.  The South Muskoka Shield won their first Russell Cup beating the Deseronto Storm 4-games-to-2.

Changes 
Douro Dukes moved and become Brock Bucks
Richmond Hill Rams become Ontario Lightning Rams
Oro-Medonte 77's joined the league
Ville-Marie Dragons joined the league
Minden Riverkings joined the league
Temiscaming Royals left the league for Northern Ontario Junior Hockey League
Ville-Marie Dragons folded mid-season (January)
Tamworth Cyclones folded mid-season (January)

With fifteen team starting the season, the league was split into a Northern Division (8 teams) and Southern Division (7 teams).

Final standings 
Note: GP = Games played; W = Wins; L = Losses; OTL = Overtime Losses; SL = Shootout Losses; GF = Goals For.

Tamworth and Ville-Marie folded for the remainder of the season.  Their remaining games are scored as 3-0 forfeit victories to their opponent.

(x-) denotes elimination from playoffs.

Teams listed on the official league website.

Standings listed on official league website.

2008–09 Russell Cup Playoffs

Playoff results are listed on the official league website.

Torpedo UST-Kamenogorsk exhibition series
In late December 2008 and early January 2009, the teams of the GMHL played a series of exhibition games against the Torpedo Ust-Kamenogorsk Under-18 team of Oskemen, Kazakhstan.

South Muskoka Shield 5 - Torpedo Ust-Kamenogorsk 4
Torpedo Ust-Kamenogorsk 8 - Toronto Canada Moose 5
Innisfil Lakers 5 - Torpedo Ust-Kamenogorsk 3
Bradford Rattlers 6 - Torpedo Ust-Kamenogorsk 5
Elliot Lake Bobcats 5 - Torpedo Ust-Kamenogorsk 3
Nipissing/Ville-Marie 8 - Torpedo Ust-Kamenogorsk 5
King Wild 5 - Torpedo Ust-Kamenogorsk 4 (OT)
Elliot Lake Bobcats 5 - Torpedo Ust-Kamenogorsk 1

Scoring leaders 
Note: GP = Games played; G = Goals; A = Assists; Pts = Points; PIM = Penalty Minutes

Leading goaltenders 
Note: GP = Games played; Mins = Minutes Played; W = Wins; L = Losses: OTL = Overtime Losses; SL = Shootout Losses; GA = Goals Allowed; SO = Shutouts; GAA = Goals Against Average

Awards
Most Valuable Player - Brett Meyers (Minden Riverkings)
Top Scorer - Adam Palm (Bradford Rattlers)
Top Defenceman - Mitch Kriz (Elliot Lake Bobcats)
Top Goaltender - Nikolajs Zurkovs (Brock Bucks)
Top Forward - Travis Saltz (South Muskoka Shield)
Rookie of the Year - Andre Leclair (Nipissing Alouettes)
Most Heart - Matt Marchese (King Wild)
Most Sportsmanlike Player - Dylan Sontag (South Muskoka Shield)
Top Defensive Forward - Chad Meagher (South Muskoka Shield)
Coach of the Year - Matt Barnhardt (Deseronto Storm)
Official of the Year - Dave Avery

See also 
 2008 in ice hockey
 2009 in ice hockey

References

External links 
 Official website of the Greater Metro Junior A Hockey League

GMHL
Greater Metro Junior A Hockey League seasons